Suzhou Singapore International School (SSIS) is an international school located in Suzhou Industrial Park in Suzhou, Jiangsu Province, China. 

SSIS offers education from Pre-Nursery up to Grade 12, offering programs of the International Baccalaureate (IB) and High School Diploma (HSD). SSIS is an IB world school and offers all three IB programs, the Primary Years Program (PYP), Middle Years Program (MYP), and Diploma Program (DP).

The school offers English instruction and also teaches Chinese, Korean, German, Japanese, Spanish, and French as second languages. However, students are also free to enroll in self-study second language courses with a private instructor of their choosing. 

The school includes a section for German students.

Overview
The school was established in September 1996 as an integral part of Suzhou Industrial Park's development, and has students of over 47 nationalities. As of 2015, 29% of the students originated from Korea, 9% originated from Germany, 8% originated from the United States, 6% originated from Taiwan, and 4% originated from Malaysia.

The IB PYP serves as the foundation for the school's curriculum from Kindergarten to Grade 5. The MYP is used to teach grades 6 through 10, and students who complete their Personal Projects or Exhibition Projects and meet the official MYP standards by the end of the 10th grade are awarded a MYP credential.

Students entering their Junior year students have the option of enrolling in either the two-year IB Diploma course or the HSD programme, which is roughly equivalent to high school programs in North America. The High School Diploma program allows students to take some IB courses, but they are not eligible to graduate with an IB diploma; instead, they obtain IB certificates for the specific courses they took.

The school moved from its old site at 82 Xing Han Street to its current campus, at 208 Zhong Nan Jie, in 2005.

References

External links
Suzhou Singapore International School official website

Educational institutions established in 1996
International Baccalaureate schools in China
Singaporean international schools in China
High schools in Suzhou
International schools in Suzhou
Association of China and Mongolia International Schools
Suzhou Industrial Park
1996 establishments in China